Sergeant Major Robert James Bye VC (12 December 1889 − 23 August 1962) was a British Army soldier and a Welsh recipient of the Victoria Cross (VC), the highest and most prestigious award for gallantry in the face of the enemy that can be awarded to British and Commonwealth forces. He was born in Pontypridd.

He was 27 years old, and a Sergeant in the 1st Bn., Welsh Guards, British Army during the First World War when the following deed took place on 31 July 1917 at the Yser Canal, Belgium during the Third Battle of Ypres for which he was awarded the VC.

When the 1/Welsh Guards attacked Pilckem Ridge the leading units, following a creeping barrage, achieved their first objective of the Black Line, but were then were halted by two pill boxes.  Bye rushed one, put it out of action and then rejoined his unit.

After suffering heavy casualties the Guards moved on to attack the Green Line.  Held up by a series of blockhouses, Bye volunteered to take charge of a party, which captured the blockhouses along with many prisoners.  Still more prisoners were taken when he advanced to the Green Line.
 
His citation read:

Bye, who moved to Nottinghamshire to work as a coal miner, also served in World War II as a sergeant major in the Sherwood Foresters guarding prisoners of war until ill health (arising from his pit work) forced him to leave the army. He then served in the Home Guard and as a temporary police constable.

His Victoria Cross is displayed at The Guards Regimental Headquarters (Welsh Guards RHQ) in London, England.

References

Monuments To Courage (David Harvey, 1999)
The Register of the Victoria Cross (This England, 1997)
VCs of the First World War - Passchendaele 1917 (Stephen Snelling, 1998)

External links
Location of grave and VC medal (Nottinghamshire)

1889 births
1962 deaths
Welsh military personnel
Burials in Nottinghamshire
British World War I recipients of the Victoria Cross
Welsh Guards soldiers
British Army personnel of World War I
People from Pontypridd
Sherwood Foresters soldiers
British Army personnel of World War II
British Home Guard soldiers
British Army recipients of the Victoria Cross
Welsh recipients of the Victoria Cross
People from Warsop